The First Family was the name of three professional wrestling stables led by Jimmy Hart, first in the late 1970s and early 1980s in the Memphis-based Continental Wrestling Association, then in the late 1980s in World Wrestling Federation (now WWE), and finally in the late 1990s in World Championship Wrestling.

Incarnations

CWA stable
The original First Family was founded in the late 1970s by Hart to take the CWA title from his former protégé, Jerry Lawler. The group extensively feuded with Lawler into the 1980s, a time particularly remembered for comedian Andy Kaufman's rivalry with Lawler.

Members

Norvell Austin
Ox Baker
King Kong Bundy
Dennis Condrey
Sabu the Wildman
Chick Donovan
Bobby Eaton
Wayne Ferris
Buddy Landel
Austin Idol
Masao Ito
Kamala
Andy Kaufman
Larry Latham
Kendo Nagasaki
Jim Neidhart
Lanny Poffo
The Iron Sheik
Kevin Sullivan
Russian Invader
Len Denton
The Bruise Brothers (Porkchop Cash and Dream Machine)
Tony Anthony
Koko Ware
Rick Rude
Randy Savage
Eddie Gilbert
Tommy Rich

WWF stable
In 1985, When Hart got hired by WWF, he began becoming a manager of wrestlers including Greg Valentine and King Kong Bundy. He briefly co-managed The Dream Team (Beefcake and Valentine) until he was phased out and gave full control to Johnny Valiant. In September 1985, Hart traded Bundy to manager Bobby Heenan in exchange for Adrian Adonis and The Missing Link.
Members
Greg Valentine
King Kong Bundy
Brutus Beefcake
Adrian Adonis
The Missing Link
Terry Funk
Hoss Funk
Bret Hart
Jim Neidhart
Danny Davis
The Honky Tonk Man
The Glamour Girls (Leilani Kai and Judy Martin)
Jacques Rougeau/The Mountie
Raymond Rougeau
Dino Bravo
Earthquake
Brian Knobbs
Jerry Sags
Typhoon
Ted DiBiase
Irwin R. Schyster
Hulk Hogan

WCW stable
Many years later, after the demise of the Dungeon of Doom in World Championship Wrestling (WCW) in 1997, Hart resurrected the First Family concept the following year, bringing together several mid-card performers. This short-lived group featured entirely different wrestlers than the Memphis version of the '70s and included former Dungeon members.

They frequently appeared on WCW programs including Monday Nitro and primarily feuded with Fit Finlay. Hugh Morrus and Brian Knobbs often tagged together, defeating members of Revolution at 1999's Fall Brawl and making a losing effort in a 3-way Tag Team Championship contest at Halloween Havoc.

With an instrumental version of "The Zoo" as their entrance theme, the stable featured a variety of colorful wrestling personalities with unique ring styles: Jerry Flynn demonstrated martial arts strikes and submissions while Brian Knobbs utilized a rougher brawling style. Considering publicity photos were taken of the group, WCW's First Family was likely intended for a substantial run; however, according to Hart, the group quickly disbanded due to injuries sustained by numerous members as well as new bookers hired by WCW. In the aftermath of The First Family, Knobbs and Hart pursued WCW's hardcore scene that was on the rise in late 1999.

Members
Barbarian
Jerry Flynn
Brian Knobbs
Hugh Morrus

Championships and accomplishments
Continental Wrestling Association
AWA International Heavyweight Championship (7 times) – Tommy Rich (1), Eddie Gilbert (2), Austin Idol (4)
NWA Mid-America Heavyweight Championship (14 times) – Tommy Rich (1), Bobby Eaton (10), Randy Savage (3)
AWA Southern Heavyweight Championship (12 times) – Tommy Rich (5), Jimmy Hart (1), Chick Donovan (1), King Kong Bundy (1), Austin Idol (3), Rick Rude (1)
AWA Southern Tag Team Championship (1 time) – King Kong Bundy and Rick Rude
AWA Southern Tag Team Championship (2 times) Porkchop Cash and Dream Machine
CWA World Tag Team Championship (1 time) Dennis Condrey and Norvell Austin

Notes

Independent promotions teams and stables
World Championship Wrestling teams and stables
1998 in professional wrestling